This article lists people from Alhambra, California.

 Hank Aguirre, baseball player
 Duane Allen, football player
 Atlas, graffiti artist
 Jairo Avila Jr., NASCAR driver
 Andrew E. Bellisario, Roman Catholic bishop
 Ron Cey, baseball player
 Jack Chick Christian evangelist and  cartoonist
 Dean Cundey, cinematographer and film director
 Clive Cussler, novelist
 Alexander Fost, dancer, So You Think You Can Dance contestant
 Amy Kim Ganter, author
 Bob Givens, animator
 Sam Hanks, race car driver, won 1957 Indianapolis 500
 Rico Harris, former Harlem Globetrotter missing since 2014
 James Jannard, fashion designer
 Frank Tenney Johnson, western artist
 Kazu Kibuishi, graphic novel illustrator
 Ralph Kiner, Hall of Fame Major League Baseball player, broadcaster
 Kenny Loggins, musician
 Danny Lopez, world champion boxer
 Lance Mountain, professional skateboarder
 Jacqueline Nguyen, United States Circuit Judge of the United States Court of Appeals for the Ninth Circuit
 Frank Pastore, baseball player
 Albie Pearson, baseball player
 Ke Huy Quan, actor, stunt coordinator
 Noé Ramirez, baseball player
 Jim Rathmann, race car driver, won 1960 Indianapolis 500
 Norman Rockwell, artist, lived in Alhambra in the early 1930s
 Dorothy Howell Rodham (1919 – 2011), homemaker, mother of U.S. Secretary of State Hillary Clinton
 Tex Schramm, president of NFL's Dallas Cowboys
 Dean Scofield, actor
 Phil Spector, music producer
 Mickey Thompson (1928-1988), race car driver. Born in Alhambra
 Cheryl Tiegs, model
 Melissa Villaseñor, comedian and impressionist, Saturday Night Live
 Mitch Vogel, actor
 Ron Warner, Third Base Coach for the St. Louis Cardinals baseball team.
 James D. Watkins, admiral
 Betty White, actress
 Verne Winchell, businessman
 Xasthur, black metal band
 Rolly Crump, Animator and designer

References 

 
Alhambra